Elizabeth Jane May (1904–1949), was an actress during the silent film era in America.

Biography

Born in Cripple Creek, Colorado on 22 June 1904, May worked in cinema from the early 1920s until 1936, appearing in at least sixteen films.

May made her first appearance for Century Comedy (also known as Century Comedies), a production company founded by Abe and Julius Stern. She was signed to a long term contract by Julius Stern in 1922. She was described in trade publications at the time as "the Century beauty" who was cast in ingenue roles but who "shows the ability to do more ambitious roles."

Her debut was in the 1922 film Upper and Lower, a comedy directed by Alf Goulding. With Century Comedy Films, she appeared in several film with Lee Moran as the lead, as well as several starring "Queenie The Human Horse." By 1923 she had been contracted by Principal Pictures Corporations.

After 1931, May tended to only appear in small, often un-credited, roles. In 1937 she was interviewed by the San Bernardino Sun for an article about breaking into acting in Hollywood, where she mentions she is studying voice and diction in hopes of getting more roles.

She died in Los Angeles on November 13, 1949 at the age of 45.

Filmography

Upper and Lower (1922)
Ten Seconds (1922)
True Blue (1922)
 Me and My Mule (1922)
The American Plan (1923)
The Home Plate (1923)
Game Hunters (1923)
East Side - West Side (1923)
 Love on the Rio Grande (1925)
Flaming Fury (1926)
Night Nurse (1931)
Sisters Under the Skin (1934)
Whom the Gods Destroy (1934)
Broadway Bill (1934)
Love Me Forever (1935)
Case of the Missing Man (1935)
Dangerous Intrigue (1936)
Sisters Under the Skin (1934)

References

1904 births
1949 deaths
American silent film actresses
20th-century American actresses
People from Cripple Creek, Colorado